The Archbishopric of Riga was an archbishopric in Medieval Livonia, a subject to the Holy See. It was established in 1186 as the bishopric of Livonia at Ikšķile, then after moving to Riga it became the bishopric of Riga in 1202 and was elevated to an archbishopric in 1255.

Archbishops of Riga 

The archbishops of Riga were also the secular rulers of Riga until 1561 when during the Reformation the territory converted from Catholicism to Lutheranism and all church territories were secularized. The see was restored as a diocese of the Catholic Church in 1918 and raised into an archdiocese in 1923.

Bishops and Archbishops of Riga 

A new Bishopric of Livonia was established in Latgalia in 1621 during the Inflanty Voivodeship of the Polish–Lithuanian Commonwealth.

Coinage 

The Archbishops of Riga were innovators in the field of minting currency, reviving techniques abandoned since the collapse of Rome. The names of individual archbishops after 1418, as well as the years of their respective reigns, are stamped on Livonian pennies excavated at archaeological sites. In many cases, this is the only biographical data available. No Livonian pennies before 1418 have been found.

See also 
Bishopric of Courland
Bishopric of Dorpat
Bishopric of Ösel-Wiek
Bishopric of Reval
Livonian Crusade
Livonian Brothers of the Sword
Monastic state of the Teutonic Knights

External links 
 More information about the role of the Archbishopric of Riga in the history of coinage is available at Medieval Livonian Numismatics by William Urban
Archbishopric of Riga (Archived 2009-10-25)
Rīgas arhibīskapija (1255-1562)
Rīgas bīskapija un virsbīskapija

References 

Prince-bishoprics in Livonia
History of Livonia
History of Riga
Medieval Latvia
Gulf of Riga
States and territories established in 1186
States and territories disestablished in 1561
1186 establishments in Europe
1561 disestablishments in Europe
Former theocracies